The Malaysian Space Agency, abbreviated MYSA, is the national space agency of Malaysia. On 20 February 2019, the Malaysian Cabinet had approved the establishment of MYSA through the merging of Malaysian Remote Sensing Agency (MRSA) and National Space Agency (ANGKASA).

In March 2019, the Minister of Energy, Science, Technology, Environment and Climate Change, Yeo Bee Yin said MYSA would focus on technology, infrastructure and strategic space application development. It would be tasked with gathering comprehensive satellite data and information systems to assist various public agencies effectively in terms of environment, natural resources, food security, disaster management and climate change management. The collected data and information can be shared with the private sector, to help them develop and achieve their own modelling system. The merge of MRSA and ANGKASA into one agency would improve work efficiencies by optimising the use of existing resources and facilities.

, the director general is Tuan Haji Azlikamil Napiah.

Function
 Develop the nation's capability in comprehensive and coordinated manner in the field of technology, application and space science
 Implement research and development and provide total solution in space technology and applications, and space science
 Acquire and provide satellite data specifically received through the national ground receiving station and generate related information for the requirement and use in various fields
 Implement the National Space Policy and value add the existing related national policy
 Coordinate and promote international cooperation in space technology research and development to strengthen the local expertise

See also 

 List of government space agencies
Malaysian Remote Sensing Agency (MRSA)
National Space Agency (ANGKASA)

References

External links 

 
 

2019 establishments in Malaysia
Space agencies
Science and technology in Malaysia
Scientific organisations based in Malaysia
 
Federal ministries, departments and agencies of Malaysia